Arena League may refer to the following indoor American football leagues:

Arena Football League, operated 1987–2019
National Arena League, operated 2017–present
American Arena League, operated 2018–present

Indoor American football
Arena Football League
National Arena League
American Arena League